Anthony José Zambrano de la Cruz (born 17 January 1998) is a Colombian sprinter. He won the silver medal at the 2019 World Championships in the 400 metres, setting the new Colombian national record of 44.15 seconds.

He was also a finalist of the 400 meters in the 2015 World Youth Championships in Athletics held in Cali, Colombia. The following year he was in the final of the 400 meters at the 2016 IAAF World U20 Championships in Bydgoszcz, Poland. He currently holds the national record and national record U23 in the 400 meters at 43.93 sec, which also becomes South American record U23 and the second best historical mark of South America in the 400 meters.  He won the 2018 South American Under-23 Championships in Athletics, setting the championship record.  In 2019 he won the Pan American Games 400 meters in Lima, Peru.

He has qualified to represent Colombia at the 2020 Summer Olympics where he won the silver medal in the 400 metres with a time of 44.08, finishing behind Steven Gardiner.

References

External links

1998 births
Living people
Colombian male sprinters
Olympic athletes of Colombia
Athletes (track and field) at the 2016 Summer Olympics
People from La Guajira Department
Pan American Games medalists in athletics (track and field)
Pan American Games gold medalists for Colombia
Athletes (track and field) at the 2019 Pan American Games
World Athletics Championships athletes for Colombia
World Athletics Championships medalists
South American Championships in Athletics winners
Pan American Games gold medalists in athletics (track and field)
Medalists at the 2019 Pan American Games
Athletes (track and field) at the 2020 Summer Olympics
Medalists at the 2020 Summer Olympics
Olympic silver medalists for Colombia
Olympic silver medalists in athletics (track and field)
21st-century Colombian people